Daniel Eaton may refer to:

Daniel Cady Eaton (1834–1895), American botanist and author
Daniel Isaac Eaton (1753–1814), English radical author and activist
Daniel Eaton (figure skater) (born 1992), American ice dancer
Daniel Eaton (cyclist)